Agusan del Norte's at-large congressional district was a short-lived congressional district that encompassed the entire province of Agusan del Norte in the Philippines. It was represented in the House of Representatives from 1969 to 1972 and in the Regular Batasang Pambansa from 1984 to 1986. The province of Agusan del Norte was created as a result of the partition of Agusan in 1967 and elected its first representative provincewide at-large during the 1969 Philippine House of Representatives elections. It was eliminated following the dissolution of the lower house in 1972 but was later absorbed by the multi-member Region X's at-large district for the national parliament in 1978. In 1984, provincial and city representations were restored and Agusan del Norte elected a member for the regular parliament. It finally became obsolete following the 1987 reapportionment that established two districts in the province under a new constitution.

Representation history

See also
Legislative districts of Agusan del Norte

References

Former congressional districts of the Philippines
Politics of Agusan del Norte
1967 establishments in the Philippines
1986 disestablishments in the Philippines
At-large congressional districts of the Philippines
Congressional districts of Caraga
Constituencies established in 1967
Constituencies disestablished in 1972
Constituencies established in 1984
Constituencies disestablished in 1986